Alexander Shaun Cullen is a politician in Ontario, Canada. He is a former Member of Provincial Parliament (MPP) in the Legislative Assembly of Ontario and a former member of Ottawa City Council, representing the Bay Ward in Ottawa's west end. He is currently the President of the Federation of Citizens Associations (FCA) in Ottawa.

Background
Cullen was born in Montreal, Quebec, to a Dutch mother and an Irish father (Henry Cullen) who was a sea captain-turned successful businessman in Montreal. Cullen attended Lower Canada College in Montreal before moving to Ottawa to attend Carleton University. At Carleton, he was the President of the Carleton University Student Liberals and served on the Carleton University Students Association as Arts Representative and later as Vice-President of CUSA. However, he didn't finish his studies at Carleton. He worked at Fat Albert's in Ottawa (a sub shop) before heading to Toronto, where he became a bank teller and savings supervisor. He then went to York University in Toronto, where he obtained both a bachelor's degree (honours) and a master's degree in economics. He also became a member of Mensa. Cullen later returned to Ottawa to join Informetrica (an economics consulting firm) as an economist, moving on to the federal Department of Health and Welfare as a policy analyst. There he joined the Economists', Statisticians' & Sociologists' Association (ESSA – a federal public service union), where he rose to Vice-President. He left the federal public service in 1991 upon election to Ottawa City Council.

Cullen is married to his third wife, Ottawa City Councillor Theresa Kavanagh. Cullen has two sons and a daughter from his previous marriages. Cullen is also active in sports: a long-time cross-country skier, Cullen has participated in the Gatineau (formerly the Keskinada) Loppet and the Canadian Ski Marathon many times (achieving bronze, silver & gold Courier de bois in the CSM). In 2006 he began running marathons (including Ottawa, Toronto and New York), and began participating in triathlons. In 2008, 2010 and 2011 Cullen was awarded the Rudy Award for completing the Winter Triathlon, the Keskinada Loppet (53 km), the Ottawa Marathon, the Rideau Lakes Cycle Tour (biking 180 km from Ottawa to Kingston and back), and an iron distance triathlon (3.8 km swimming, 180 km cycling, 42.2 km running). In 2011 he was awarded Francophile of the Year by ACFO (Ottawa), and in 2013 was awarded the Queen's Diamond Jubilee medal for his contribution to public service.

Political career

Municipal politics, Part I
In 1982, Cullen was elected school board trustee with the Ottawa Board of Education representing the "Western Zone". In 1985, he was re-elected as a school board trustee representing Queensboro and Carleton Wards. During this time Cullen was also active in Kiwanis, serving as President of the Westboro Kiwanis Club in 1985-86.

In 1988 he ran for Ottawa City Council in the Richmond Ward but lost to incumbent Jacquelin Holzman. When Holzman vacated the seat to successfully run for mayor in the 1991 election, Cullen, then a community association president in the ward (Glabar Park Community Alliance), ran again and won the seat in a close three-way race.

As an Ottawa City Councillor he also served jointly on the Council of the Regional Municipality of Ottawa-Carleton. In 1994 Cullen was elected as the first Regional Councillor for Bay Ward, when provincial legislation created a directly elected Regional Council.

Provincial politics, Part I
In the 1985 provincial election, he ran as a Liberal candidate in the riding of Ottawa West but lost to Ontario Progressive Conservative Party incumbent Reuben Baetz, a cabinet minister, by about 3,000 votes. Cullen again sought the Liberal nomination to run in the Ottawa West riding in the 1987 election, but lost to local lawyer Bob Chiarelli. In 1996, Cullen supported Dalton McGuinty to lead the Ontario Liberal Party.

In 1997, Bob Chiarelli resigned from the Legislature to run for Chair of the Ottawa-Carleton Regional Municipality. In the subsequent Ottawa West by-election, Cullen ran for the Liberals and was easily elected as MPP. In May 1998, he gained national prominence as the only provincial legislator in the country to vote against the Calgary Declaration, as he opposed any document that didn't recognize the paramountcy of the Charter of Rights.

This vote made him unpopular within the Liberal Party. In the run-up to the 1999 provincial election, Cullen was challenged for the Liberal nomination in the new riding of Ottawa West—Nepean by Rick Chiarelli, a Nepean city councillor. In September 1998, Cullen lost the nomination battle to Chiarelli. On October 20, 1998 Cullen was expelled from the Liberal caucus and sat as an independent MPP.  He joined the New Democratic Party a few weeks later, and subsequently won the NDP nomination in the riding.

In the 1999 Ontario general election, Cullen ran in the newly configured riding of Ottawa West—Nepean and placed third with 7,701 votes behind second place Chiarelli (16,419 votes). Progressive Conservative Garry Guzzo was elected with 22,834 votes.

Municipal politics, Part II
In 1999 Cullen became Executive Director of the Council on Aging, a United Way agency and lobby group for seniors. Cullen was elected to represent Bay Ward in newly amalgamated City of Ottawa in 2000, and was re-elected in 2003 and 2006, defeating high-profile right-wing challenger Terry Kilrea. During his tenure Cullen served as Chair of the City's Transit Committee (responsible for public transit service in Ottawa), and on the Board of Directors of Ottawa Community Housing (the City's social housing agency) and Hydro Ottawa.

On January 4, 2010, Cullen filed his nomination to run for mayor in Ottawa's 2010 municipal election.  On August 31, Cullen dropped out of the race, citing low funds, the addition of another left wing candidate (Clive Doucet) and a desire to defeat Terry Kilrea in Bay Ward. On October 25, 2010, Cullen lost in his bid for re-election in Bay Ward to challenger Mark Taylor. Cullen cited his late entry into the race in Bay Ward as the reason for his loss.

Provincial politics, Part II
In January 2013, Cullen sought the Ontario NDP nomination in the riding of Ottawa Centre for the 41st Ontario general election, but was defeated by Ottawa-Carleton District School Board Trustee Jennifer McKenzie. Cullen subsequently won the Ontario NDP nomination in the riding of Ottawa West—Nepean but was defeated on June 12, 2014, by the Liberal candidate Bob Chiarelli.

Municipal politics, Part III
In June 2014, Cullen registered to run in Bay Ward (his former municipal ward) in the City of Ottawa, against incumbent Mark Taylor. Cullen received media attention during the election upon the release of his report on the 2010 Ottawa municipal election finances (similar to previous reports Cullen had written following the 2003 and 2006 municipal elections), where he made a case for banning corporate and union campaign contributions.

On October 27, 2014 (election day) Cullen lost to incumbent Mark Taylor in a closely fought campaign by 474 votes (Taylor: 5,750; Cullen 5,276; 4 other candidates 1,234).

Electoral record

References

External links
 
 

1951 births
Canadian people of Irish descent
Canadian people of Dutch descent
Carleton University alumni
Living people
Ontario Liberal Party MPPs
Ontario New Democratic Party MPPs
Ottawa city councillors
Ottawa-Carleton regional councillors
Politicians from Montreal
York University alumni
Mensans
Ontario school board trustees